Przystań may refer to the following places:
Przystań, Kuyavian-Pomeranian Voivodeship (north-central Poland)
Przystań, Masovian Voivodeship (east-central Poland)
Przystań, Warmian-Masurian Voivodeship (north Poland)